The Pascual Marquez Family Cemetery, located in Santa Monica Canyon, is the family burial ground of one of the original grantees of the Rancho Boca de Santa Monica. “This is not only one of the original pioneer settlements, but one of the last which survives in the midst of modern developments.”

“The cemetery grounds consist of a rectangular lot surrounded by a masonry and stucco wall built in 1926 by architect John Byers. Belonging to the Marquez family, this private family cemetery dates to the 1840s and formed part of the  Rancho Boca de Santa Monica, a Mexican land grant given to Francisco Marquez in 1839. The cemetery is…the oldest private family cemetery in Los Angeles.” 

The cemetery and a separate piece of property owned by descendant  Rosemary Marquez Romero Miano are the last remnants of the original ranch to be still owned by the Marquez family. The rancho originally extended along the beach from Topanga Road to Montana Avenue and then east. “The Marquez and Reyes families lived…in the Canyon, under the flags of three countries: Spain, Mexico, and the United States, without ever leaving their Rancho homes.”

The first burials in the cemetery were infants of rancho grantee Francisco Marquez and his wife Roque Valenzuela; Marquez buried the babies just outside his home in the canyon. The couple had 11 children altogether but only five survived to adulthood. In 1916, the final burial on the land was Pascual Marquez, Francisco’s youngest son.

Burials are now marked with contemporary crosses in various artistic styles made by Pascual Marquez’s grandson Ernest Marquez. A photo from the 1890s shows a few wooden crosses placed on graves, “all of them [now] long gone.” Ground-penetrating radar provided by UCLA Cotsen Institute of Archaeology and search dogs trained in “historical human remains detection” were used to find the lost locations of the graves.

Dorothy Gillis Loomis, daughter of the owner of Santa Monica Land & Water Company, which bought most of the rancho land in the early 20th century, was the first protector of the cemetery from outside of the family. She convinced her father not to develop the cemetery land, provided for the construction of the adobe wall, and donated the statue of San Lorenzo, which is from Mexico and carved out of a whole tree trunk.

The cemetery was photographed by the Works Progress Administration on July 21, 1937. The landscaping of the San Lorenzo shrine at that time was opuntia and cholla. The original wooden crosses are already gone from the burial ground. One grave marker or footstone is visible in the center.

The San Lorenzo Garden, or Santuario San Lorenzo, in front of the burial ground was a subject of legal disputes over historic easements. In 2011, the owners of the “garden” property, Fred Marcus and Davida Rochlin, sold the land (then said to be valued at $127,500 and likely worth many millions at current Palisades residential real estate prices) for  $35,000, so that the cemetery would always be accessible to descendants and students of history.

The sanctuary garden and burial ground are closed to the public but the descendants occasionally offer guided tours, including to students from the local Canyon Elementary School.

Further reading 
 Marquez, Ernest; Marquez, Monica, Pascual Marquez family cemetery: Rancho Boca de Santa Monica, Canoga Park, Calif. 2000.
 Marquez, Ernest, Rancho Boca de Santa Monica: The 1839 California Land Grant—A History, Angel City Press, ISBN 978-1-62640-093-1.

See also
 Rancho Boca de Santa Monica
 List of Los Angeles Historic-Cultural Monuments on the Westside

References

External links
 LANow on YouTube: Pascual Marquez Family Cemetery
 MarquezCemetery.org
 Santa Monica Conservancy: Pascual Marquez Family Cemetery
 Pacific Palisades Historical Society: Pasqual Marquez Family Cemetery

Los Angeles Historic-Cultural Monuments
Pacific Palisades, Los Angeles
Cemeteries in Los Angeles